Sue Lake is located in Glacier National Park, in the U. S. state of Montana. Sue Lake is situated immediately northwest of Mount Kipp. Immediately after flowing out of Sue Lake, the Mokowanis River descends  over Raven Quiver Falls.

See also
List of lakes in Glacier County, Montana

References

Lakes of Glacier National Park (U.S.)
Lakes of Glacier County, Montana